Simon Elisor (born 22 July 1999) is a French professional footballer who plays as a forward for  club Laval on loan from the Belgian club Seraing.

Club career
Trained as a youth with Istres, where he played in Championnat National 3, Elisor joined Ajaccio in the summer of 2019.

He made his senior debut for the Corsican club in a 1–0 Ligue 2 loss to Caen on 29 August 2020. In February 2021 he signed his first professional contract with Ajaccio, and moved on loan to Sète until the end of the 2020–21 season.

On 11 July 2022, Elisor signed a four-year contract with Seraing in Belgium. On 5 January 2023, Elisor was loaned by Laval in Ligue 2.

References

External links
 

1999 births
People from Périgueux
Sportspeople from Dordogne
Footballers from Nouvelle-Aquitaine
French people of Guadeloupean descent
Living people
French footballers
Association football forwards
FC Istres players
AC Ajaccio players
FC Sète 34 players
FC Villefranche Beaujolais players
R.F.C. Seraing (1922) players
Stade Lavallois players
Ligue 2 players
Championnat National players
Championnat National 3 players
Belgian Pro League players
French expatriate footballers
Expatriate footballers in Belgium
French expatriate sportspeople in Belgium